Bilenke Council is a local government area in Ukraine which can refer to:
 Bilenke Council, Donetsk Oblast
 Bilenke Council, Zaporizhia Oblast